Bert, baron De Graeve (born 1955, Avelgem) is a Belgian businessman and since 20 May 2006 chief executive officer (CEO) and chairman of Bekaert, where he succeeded baron Julien De Wilde. In 2014 he became chairman of the board.

Education
Bert De Grave studied at the Sint-Barbaracollege in Ghent.
He graduated as a lawyer from the Ghent University (Ghent) in 1980. In addition, he studied financial management at the IPO-UFSIA Management School (Antwerp) and became Master in Tax Management at VLEKHO (Brussels).

Career
He started his career in 1980 at Arthur Andersen. From 1982 until 1996 he worked for Alcatel Bell. From 1982 until 1991 he worked in various financial responsibilities. From 1991 until 1994 he was General manager Shanghai Bell Telephone Equipm. Mfg. Cy, Shanghai. From 1994 until 1996 he worked in Paris as vice-president, Director Operations, Alcatel Trade international. In 1996 he was Director International Affairs, Alcatel Alsthom in Paris.

From 1996 until 2002, Bert De Graeve was managing director of the Vlaamse Radio- en Televisieomroep (Flemish Public radio and television), after which he was succeeded by Tony Mary.

From 2002 until 2005, he was Bekaert Group executive vice president, chief financial and administration officer and sorporate secretary. Since May 2006 he has been chief executive officer (CEO) and in May 2014 he became chairman of Bekaert Group.

Sources
 Kandidaat 4: Bert De Graeve (Bekaert)
 Bert De Graeve nieuwe CEO Bekaert

1955 births
Living people
People from West Flanders
Belgian businesspeople
Ghent University alumni
Belgian chief executives